Venusia purpuraria is a moth in the family Geometridae first described by George Hampson in 1895. It is found in India.

References

Moths described in 1895
Venusia (moth)